Iza or IZA may refer to:

Places
 Iza, Boyacá, town and municipality in Boyacá Department, Colombia 
Iza, Iran, in Mazandaran Province
Iza, Spain, in Navarra
Iža, a village in Slovakia
Iza, Ukraine, a village in Ukraine
Iza (river), a river of northern Romania
Zona da Mata Regional Airport (IATA code IZA), serving Juiz de Fora, Brazil

Other uses
Iza (singer), Brazilian singer
IZA (album), by Izabella Scorupco (1991)
Iza Calzado (born 1982), Filipina actress
IZA Institute of Labor Economics (IZA), a research institute and academic network headquartered in Bonn, Germany

See also 
 Itza (disambiguation)
 Izza (disambiguation)